Ralf Heinrich Adams (born 1966) is a biochemist and cell biologist. He is director at the Max Planck Institute for Molecular Biomedicine and head of the Department of Tissue Morphogenesis in Münster, Germany.

Biography
In the year 1996 Adams obtained a PhD in Biochemistry for his work at the Max Planck Institute for Brain Research in Frankfurt (Germany), which includes the discovery of several novel semaphorin family molecules and the characterization of their role in axon guidance.

As a postdoctoral research fellow with Dr R. Klein at the European Molecular Biology Laboratory in Heidelberg during the years 1996 to 2000, he was among the first to discover that ephrin-B2, a ligand for Eph receptor tyrosine kinases, is a marker for arterial endothelial cells and an important regulator of blood vessel morphogenesis in the developing embryo. Together with his collaborator Dr A. Nebrada, he also demonstrated that the p38α mitogen-activated protein kinase is required for the formation of the vascular network inside the placenta.

In 2000 Adams became head of the Vascular Development Laboratory at the Cancer Research UK London Research Institute (formerly, Imperial Cancer Research Fund) and Honorary Senior Research Fellow at the University College London.

Since 2007 Adams is Professor for ‘Vascular Biology’ at the Westfälische Wilhelms University and Director at the MPI for Molecular Biomedicine in Münster, Germany.

He is a member of the Editorial Board for Genes & Development.

Research
Dr Adams and his co-workers have made significant achievements by combining genetic approaches in the mouse with a wide range of cell and molecular biology methods.

Several of their discoveries are directly relevant for human pathologies. For example, they were the first to show that the Eph receptor ligand ephrin-B1 controls skeletal morphogenesis and that defects in the human gene (EFNB1) lead to Craniofrontonasal Syndrome (CFNS). A different project has connected the cytoplasmic multi-PDZ domain protein GRIP1, an interaction partner of Eph/ephrin proteins and other molecules, with the rare but severe human congenital disease Fraser Syndrome. They also demonstrated that Junctional Adhesion Molecules (JAMs) are critical regulators of cell polarity.

After his move to the Max Planck Institute for Molecular Biomedicine in the year 2008, Adams found that the Notch ligand Jagged1 antagonizes the function of Dll4 and thereby acts as an important pro-angiogenic switch in endothelial cells. His team also discovered that the transmembrane protein ephrin-B2 controls endothelial cell motility and VEGF receptor endocytosis.

Although his work has addressed many important aspects of tissue and organ morphogenesis, the interaction of different cells and cell types during the formation of new blood vessels is a central research interest in the laboratory of Dr Adams.

Awards and Fellowships 
 1988:  Scholarship 'Studienstiftung des Deutschen Volkes'
 1996:  Otto Hahn Medal of the Max Planck Society
 1996:  EMBO Long Term Fellowship
 2000:  Werner Risau Memorial Award
 2000:  EMBO Young Investigator Programme

Memberships 
 British Society for Developmental Biology
 North American Vascular Biology Organization
 Society for Biochemistry and Molecular Biology (GBM)
 German Society for Cell Biology

References

External links 
 Website of the Max Planck Society
 Website of Adams' Department at the Max Planck Institute for Molecular Biomedicine
 Publications

1966 births
Living people
German molecular biologists
German biochemists
Cell biologists
Goethe University Frankfurt alumni
Max Planck Society alumni
Max Planck Institute directors
Academic staff of the University of Münster